Randall Gilbert Marsh (born April 8, 1949) is an American former umpire in Major League Baseball who worked in the National League from 1981 to 1999 and throughout both major leagues from 2000 to 2009. Marsh wore the uniform number 30.

Major League career
Marsh umpired in the World Series in 1990, 1997, 1999, 2003, and 2006, serving as crew chief for the last three Series, and in the All-Star Game in 1985, 1988, 1996, and 2006, calling balls and strikes for the 1996 game. He is the tenth umpire in history to serve as crew chief for three World Series.

Marsh also officiated in nine League Championship Series (1989, 1992, 1995, 2000, 2002, 2004, 2005, 2007, 2009) and in five Division Series (1998, 1999, 2001, 2003, 2006). He had been a crew chief from the 1998 season until his retirement following the 2009 season.

Marsh was the crew chief of Crew P for 2009, which included Mike Winters, Alfonso Márquez, and Lance Barksdale. Marsh was known for a comparatively small yet highly consistent strike zone, meaning he was among the most popular umpires for pitchers as well as hitters.

Marsh retired from umpiring following the 2009 season. , he is the Director of Umpiring for Major League Baseball.

Awards & Accolades 
In 2015, Marsh was inducted into The Kentucky Athletic Hall of Fame.

Personal life
A native of Covington, Kentucky, Marsh is a graduate of Covington Holmes High School and the University of Kentucky.

In May 2008, Marsh underwent open-heart surgery; he returned to the field in August.

See also

 List of Major League Baseball umpires

References

Further reading
USA Today Q&A October 2008

External links
Retrosheet
Major league profile

1949 births
Living people
Major League Baseball umpires
Sportspeople from Covington, Kentucky
Sportspeople from the Cincinnati metropolitan area